The Billion Dollar Chicken Shop (also known as Inside KFC) is a 2015 British English three-part documentary television miniseries that premiered on BBC One. The series goes behind the scenes of the fast food restaurant chain KFC. The series narrated by Ralf Little, distributed by BBC Television, music composed by Sandy Nuttgens and Spike Scott, executive produced by Paul Hamann, edited by Gwyn Jones, Mac Mackenzie and Jason Savage, directed and produced by Stephen Finnigan and Damian O'Mahony, financed by BBC and also produced by Wild Pictures.

Premise
The Billion Dollar Chicken Shop goes behind the scenes of the fast food restaurant chain KFC.

Cast
 Ralf Little (Himself) as the Narrator

Production
Originally titled Inside KFC. The series was commissioned by Emma Willis, controller of BBC documentaries and announced by Charlotte Moore.

Broadcast
The Billion Dollar Chicken Shop premiered on BBC One in the United Kingdom on 18 March 2015.

See also
Inside British Airways
Inside Claridge's
The Route Masters: Running London's Roads
Iceland Foods: Life in the Freezer Cabinet

References

External links

2015 British television series debuts
2015 British television series endings
2010s British documentary television series
BBC television documentaries
English-language television shows
KFC